Zoo Knoxville, formerly known as the Knoxville Zoo or Knoxville Zoological Gardens, is a  zoo located just east of downtown Knoxville, Tennessee, United States, near exit 392 off Interstate 40. The zoo is home to about 1,200 animals and welcomes over 585,000 visitors each year.

Zoo Knoxville is notable for having bred the first two African Elephants born in the Western Hemisphere in 1978. The zoo also has bred more endangered red pandas than any other zoo in the world and is a leader in the breeding of endangered tortoises.

The zoo is accredited by the Association of Zoos and Aquariums (AZA).

History 
In 1923, an initiative was started by a local newspaper to start a park for poor children, driven by a Birthday Fund. After slow progress, the Birthday Park was established in 1935 with help from the city of Knoxville and the New Deal. The park included a stone shelter, small playground, and a wading pool on a hillside in Chilhowee Park. Discussion started about introducing a zoo, but funding again became an issue, and the Birthday Park fell into disuse and neglect before being closed in 1946.

In 1948, the News Sentinel aimed to revitalize the property as the Birthday Park Zoo using some leftover money from the 1923 initiative, plus more help from the city of Knoxville. In 1951, the zoo was opened and renamed the Municipal Zoo, with the first attraction being an American alligator named "Al". Around 4,000 people visited in the first day of opening.

In 1963, the Ringling Bros. and Barnum & Bailey Circus donated a particularly troublesome seven-ton bull elephant named "Louie", or "Old Diamond". While this initially raised public interest, conditions and funds soon deteriorated, and Old Diamond contributed more problems by tearing up his early enclosures. In 1966, the Metropolitan Planning Commission announced plans to revitalize and modernize the zoo, but a lack of funds once again grounded the project through 1970. Following an effort by the Knoxville Journal to "Save Old Diamond", successful television executive Guy Lincoln Smith III bought a lion cub and took care of it until a proper facility could be built, while Dr. Bill Patterson helped found the Appalachian Zoological Society to oversee the formation of an educational zoo. With these two efforts, the modern Knoxville Zoo was founded in 1971.

In the following years, Old Diamond was successfully mated to two younger female elephants, with two daughters being born in 1978. These were the first two African elephants born in the Western Hemisphere. This set a precedent for Knoxville Zoo to continue to work within the field of conservation, notably with red pandas and spider tortoises.

In 2016, Knoxville Zoo announced a massive rebranding campaign alongside a slew of new and/or revitalized exhibits. With this, zoo executives announced that the property would be renamed Zoo Knoxville, reflecting a change that a few other zoos across the country had done.

Exhibits

Zoo Knoxville is broadly divided two halves, East Zoo and West Zoo. Each section mainly features large and naturalistic outdoor habitats for many of their animal residents, as well as a few smaller indoor exhibits.

Black Bear Falls 
Upon entering, the first habitat is Black Bear Falls, housing several American black bears, an important species native to the nearby Great Smoky Mountains. Several viewing areas are featured, as well as a small cave with educational facts about bears' hibernation behavior and diet for children to explore.

Boyd Family Asian Trek and Red Panda Village 
Continuing to the East Zoo, the Boyd Family Red Panda Village is world-renowned for their red panda conservation program. In 2017, this section of the zoo was greatly expanded and revitalized as the Boyd Family Asian Trek, containing new habitats with Malayan tigers, white-handed gibbons, silvered leaf langurs, and white-naped cranes.

Clayton Family Kids Cove 
At the east end of the zoo, Clayton Family Kids Cove contains a variety of activities geared towards children. These include a carousel, petting zoo, playground, and sandbox. Regarding animal exhibits, Kids Cove features a petting zoo with a number of domestic animals like sheep and goats, as well as a small exhibit featuring North American beavers and budgies.

The far eastern area of the zoo by Kids Cove formerly held the original reptile house, along with a few smaller exhibits with otters and birds. This, along with other regions along the perimeter of the zoo, are going extensive revitalization as part of the zoo's larger rebranding campaign announced in 2016. As of March 2022, this region of the zoo only displays retired birds-of-prey from the zoo's former bird show.

Clayton Family Amphibian and Reptile Conservation Campus 
Following the closure of the outdated reptile houses at the eastern end of the zoo, the brand-new Clayton Family Amphibian and Reptile Conservation Campus (ARC) opened just past the Black Bear Falls in the spring of 2021, replacing a smaller "Birds of Central America" exhibit at the center of the zoo. This exhibit containing dozens of indoor naturalistic habitats for various reptile and amphibian species, and it is considered to be massive upgrade from the previous version. Notable species include the Cuban crocodile and various tortoise species that are a focal point of the zoo's conservation efforts. The exhibit also features a two-toed sloth.

As part of the second phase of this building complex, the Clayton Otter Creek exhibit features a revitalized habitat for the zoo's two North American river otters, opening in March 2022.

Directly across from the ARC, a small compound features Geoffrey's marmosets, Chacoan peccaries, a six-banded armadillo, and porcupines (one Brazilian and one African crested).

Grasslands Africa 
In West Zoo, the largest series of habitats are intended to evoke an African savanna. The Stokely African Elephant Preserve houses three African elephants: a male named Tonka and two females named Jada and Edie. The Williams Family Giraffe Encounter provides guests with the opportunity to feed reticulated giraffes. Other featured species include Hartmann's mountain zebras, southern white rhinos, southern ground hornbills, and a bat-eared fox. Just past these is a restaurant and a splash pad for children, and farther up is the Valley of the Kings exhibit, housing neighboring attractions with African lions and Hamadryas baboons respectively. Originally, the path past the Valley of the Kings looped back around to the rest of the zoo, but this has been closed for some time as part of the zoo's larger renovation plans.

Gorilla Valley and Chimp Ridge 
The rest of West Zoo is largely themed around a bamboo forest leading to Gorilla Valley and Chimp Ridge, housing large families of western lowland gorillas and chimpanzees respectively. Other habitats featured species such as African wild dogs, red wolves, yellow-backed duikers, and an elderly Lar gibbon not housed in the Boyd Family Asian Trek.

Conservation

The Knoxville Zoo has been successful at breeding several endangered species, especially red pandas and white rhinos. The zoo also bred the first African elephant in captivity in the Western Hemisphere, nicknamed "Lil' Diamond" in 1978.

In 2009, Sarah Glass, curator of red pandas and Special Exhibits at the Knoxville Zoo in Knoxville, Tennessee, was appointed as coordinator for the North American Red Panda Species Survival Plan. The Knoxville Zoo has the largest number of captive red panda births in the Western Hemisphere (101 as of August 2011). Only the Rotterdam Zoo in the Netherlands has had more captive births worldwide.

At the end of 2010, Mozilla Foundation—the creator of Firefox web browser—partnered with Knoxville Zoo in an effort to raise awareness about endangered red pandas. Two red panda cubs born at the Knoxville Zoo have officially become a part of the Mozilla community. The cubs were named Spark and Ember by online voters, and Mozilla broadcast a 24-hour live video stream of the cubs.

The recently opened Amphibian and Reptile Center (ARC) undertakes conservation of endangered species, notably various species of turtles and tortoises.

Incidents
On January 14, 2011, zookeeper Stephanie James was killed when one of the zoo's two female elephants, "Edie", pushed her into the side of the indoor stall. The incident was deemed to be an accident, not a malicious attack by the elephant. In James' memory, a small fountain and garden is set up between the elephant and rhino exhibits along the Grasslands Africa trek.

Notes

External links
 
Zoo Knoxville's Conservation Work

Culture of Knoxville, Tennessee
Knoxville
Tourist attractions in Knoxville, Tennessee
Buildings and structures in Knoxville, Tennessee